Lt. Colonel Jhr. 
Bodo Sandberg (September 23, 1914 - May 2, 2005) was a fighter pilot in the Royal Netherlands Air Force and 'Engelandvaarder' during World War II. He was awarded the Cross of Merit and the Airman's Cross for his bravery during the German invasion of May 1940.

Sandberg died on May 2, 2005 in Bentveld, Netherlands.

Biography

Bodo Sandberg was born in Rotterdam on September 23, 1914. From early childhood he wanted to fly so much that, at the age of 16, he built his own airplane. He had no money for an engine so he built himself a glider. When he finished it, a friendly pilot in an old bi-plane on a local airfield pulled him up in the air and he flew.

In those early days you couldn't just become a pilot. If you wanted to fly you had to join the Air Force. And so he did.

On August 26, 1939, Sandberg made history in Dutch aviation: he made the first successful belly landing.

On May 13, 1940, three days after the Germans had invaded the Netherlands, Sandberg was called into action. Because the Nazis had destroyed almost all the planes of the Dutch Air Force, Sandberg had to fly one of the few Fokker G-I fighters that were still airworthy. Along with one other G-1 fighter, he had to protect the last Dutch bomber, a Fokker T-5, against a deluge of German Messerschmitt aircraft. The small squadron's task was to bomb the Moerdijkbruggen(Moerdijk bridges), the Netherlands' largest bridges over the wide estuary of the Haringvliet, to hold back the German invasion. Just beyond Dordrecht, the squadron was attacked by nine Messerschmitt fighters, three of which attacked the T-5. The other six split up and attacked the two G-1s. The T5 went down in flames and crashed in the Grienden along the Noord, near Ridderkerk. The other G-1 was also shot down and crashed in a polder at Nieuw-Lekkerland. Pilot Sgt. Paul Schoute perished in the violently burning wreck. Hans Lindner was thrown out of the plane and ended up against the verge of a waterway with his leg shot off. His hair still burning. Someone rushed to help him, extinguished it with water from the canal, but he died shortly thereafter. Only one G-1 fighter plane, in this mission that was so vital in Holland's desperate defense against the Nazi invaders, managed to outfly the onslaught of the German Messerschmits. Shot by the machine guns from the Messerschmits, Sandberg was bleeding from bullet holes through his leather pilot's jacket, but he found a cloud in the air in which he could hide and, thanks to that cloud, he managed to escape from the German attackers. Not for long though, as his plane had taken fire as well and he could not make it back to base. But luck was with him again. He managed to keep his damaged plane in the air long enough to find a highway near the Hague where he could make an emergency landing. It was a close call but Sandberg and his crew-member v.d. Breemer survived this mission. They were the only two.

Escape to England and fighting on two fronts
Immediately after the German invasion Sandberg tried to escape from the Nazi occupied Netherlands to reach England from where he could continue his fight against the invaders.

His first attempt was with four others (Ch. A. den Hoed, G. Reels, E.A. Plate and J. Versteegh). On their way through Belgium, France and Spain to Portugal (from where they could fly to England), they made it as far as Poligny, just east of Paris, but there they were betrayed and arrested. They ended up in a German prisoner of war camp outside Lyon. However, they escaped from that prison camp by stealing the camp commander's car. They were starved and sick, but all five made it back to the Netherlands.

Sandberg, however, didn't give up and made a second attempt. This time he escaped from the Nazi occupied Netherlands with three fellow fighter pilots from the Dutch Air Force Jan Bosch, Faam Janssens and A.C.H. Kanters, and this time they made it, all the way to England.

From England Bodo was sent to the USA where in 1944 he trained on US fighter planes (the Curtiss P-40 Warhawk) at the Royal Netherlands Military Flying-School in Jackson, Mississippi. After completing his training, he was sent to Australia and New Guinea in the South Pacific, where he fought against the Japanese.

As the Second World War was entering its final and fiercest phase, Bodo Sandberg came home to the Netherlands from the USA, Australia and New Guinea, albeit for a fleeting moment, as he was sent out into action again, this time to Dutch Indonesia, Singapore and Ceylon (now Malaysia). In February 1946 he flew from Batavia (now Jarakrta), via Singapore to Penang where he worked with Peter Tazelaar, one of the Netherlands’ most heroic resistance fighters and fellow "Engelandvaarder".

In 1947 Bodo was awarded the “Ereteken voor Orde en Vrede 1947” for his contributions to the Netherlands' efforts to re-establish peace and order in Dutch-Indonesia after the Japanese capitulation.

Jhr. Bodo Sandberg fought enemy action on two fronts, survived it all, and lived to be 90.

Sandberg was awarded the Cross of Merit and the Airman's Cross, both Knight’s Orders, by H.R.H. Wilhelmina, Queen of the Netherlands.

After the war
After the war, Bodo stayed active in the Dutch Air Force as a fighter pilot and flight instructor. He was Commander of a squadron of Supermarine Spitfires in the Dutch Air Force Base “Soesterberg”. After Sandberg was injured in a crash with a Spitfire at Soesterberg, Sandberg became Air Attaché for the four Nordic countries in the Dutch Embassy in Oslo, Norway. Sandberg completed his more than 30 year Air Force career as Commander of the Dutch Air Force Base Ypenburg.

Private life 
Sandberg married Catharina Elisabeth (Lies) Sandberg-Brugsma in Haarlem, the Netherlands, on November 23, 1939.

They had two sons, Jhr. Steven W.H. Sandberg (Haarlem, August 25, 1940 - Aerdenhout, March 18, 2016) and Jhr. Job B.B. Sandberg (Job Sandberg), Haarlem, March 23, 1946.

Military and Knight's Orders

Sandberg's awards: On the left side, two pilot wings of the Royal Dutch Air Force, a Pilot-Observer-wing of the ML-KNIL, and an embroidered Pilot-Observer-wing of MLD-model.
 Commander of the Royal Order of St. Olav
 Airman's Cross, 1941 (For: “Netherlands, May 10–14, 1940, attack on the Moerdijk bridges”)
 Cross of Merit (Netherlands), 1941
 Oorlogsherinneringskruis with two stars 1941
 Ereteken voor Orde en Vrede 1947
 Distinction of Honor for Long Term Service as Officer, with number 30
 Royal Order of the Sword (Sweden)

References

External links 
 The Story of Bodo Sandberg

Royal Netherlands Air Force officers
1914 births
2005 deaths
Royal Netherlands Air Force personnel of World War II
Royal Netherlands Air Force pilots
Recipients of the Order of the Sword
Recipients of the Airman's Cross
Recipients of the Cross of Merit (Netherlands)
Military personnel from Rotterdam